The Quiet One is a 1948 American documentary film directed by Sidney Meyers. The documentary chronicles the rehabilitation of a young, emotionally disturbed African-American boy; it contains a commentary written by James Agee, and narrated by Gary Merrill. In his 1949 review, Bosley Crowther characterized the film succinctly:

The still photographer Helen Levitt was one of the film's cinematographers and writers, along with the painter Janice Loeb, who also produced. The neoclassical composer Ulysses Kay wrote the score for the film. The film's principal cinematographer, Richard Bagley, also photographed the critically acclaimed New York semidocumentary feature On the Bowery.

The film was nominated for the Academy Award for Best Documentary Feature at the 21st Academy Awards, losing to The Secret Land, and was then nominated for the Academy Award for Best Original Screenplay at the 22nd Academy Awards the next year, losing to Battleground. Along with Street Angel, it is one of two English-language films to receive Oscar nominations in separate years.

The National Board of Review named The Quiet One the second best film of 1949.

References

External links 
 
 

1948 films
American documentary films
Films directed by Sidney Meyers
Documentary films about children with disability
Documentary films about African Americans
1948 documentary films
Black-and-white documentary films
American black-and-white films
1940s English-language films
1940s American films